Ura was a very important port on the east Mediterranean coast of the southern Anatolia, in the Late Bronze Age and Iron Age, probably located at the site of modern Silifke, or further west of Gilindere. 

In the Late Bronze Age Ura belonged to the kingdom of Tarhuntassa.

Ura was the major port of Anatolia to which grain and goods were brought from Egypt and Canaan via Ugarit for transshipment to the Hitite Empire.

Ura is perhaps to be identified with the site of Soli (later Pompeiopolis). This city was founded by Greeks on the Mediterranean coast, in the 8th century BC.

References

Further reading

Trevor Bryce, The Peoples and Places of Ancient Western Asia, Routledge, Oxon, 2011, 
Trevor Bryce, The Kingdom of Hittites, Oxford University Press, New York, 2005, 

Bronze Age sites in Europe
Hittite sites in Turkey
Iron Age sites in Europe
Former populated places in Turkey
Lost ancient cities and towns